Joina City is the 3rd tallest building in Zimbabwe standing at 105 metres (behind the Rerseve Bank of Zimbabwe (120m) and NRZ Headquarters (110m). It is owned by Masawara Investments. The building has the single largest lift and escalator installation in Zimbabwe. Construction started in 1998 but was halted due economic crisis that was plaguing Zimbabwe. then resumed and completed in 2010

The Building has 3 basement parking floors, 2 Open Shopping Mall namely Lower Ground (UG) and Upper Ground (UG) and 19 Commercial Floors.

References

Buildings and structures in Zimbabwe
Harare